Unión Deportiva Tenerife Sur Ibarra is a Spanish football team based in Arona, southern Tenerife in the autonomous community of Canary Islands, Spain. Founded in 1969 it plays in Tercera División – Group 12, holding home matches at Estadio Villa Isabel, with a 3,000-seat capacity.

History 
In the 2017-18 season the club finished 5th in the Tercera División, Group 12. The following season was less successful, as the club finished in the middle, 10th among 20 teams.

Season to season

References

External links
 

Football clubs in the Canary Islands
Association football clubs established in 1969
Sport in Tenerife
1969 establishments in Spain